Alexander Thomson was a Scottish footballer who played as an inside forward.

Career
Born in Coatbridge, Thomson played club football solely for Airdrieonians, and made one appearance for Scotland in 1909.

References

Year of birth missing
Year of death missing
Scottish footballers
Scotland international footballers
Airdrieonians F.C. (1878) players
Association football inside forwards
Footballers from Coatbridge
Place of death missing
Scottish Football League players